Tampichthys is a genus of cyprinid fish endemic to east–central Mexico. They are entirely restricted to the Pánuco River basin, except T. ipni which also occurs in some other Mexican rivers that drain into the Gulf of Mexico.

Species
Tampichthys was formerly considered a part of Dionda instead of a separate genus. There are six described species in Tampichthys, but undescribed species are known.

 Tampichthys catostomops (C. L. Hubbs & R. R. Miller, 1977) (Pánuco minnow)
 Tampichthys dichromus (C. L. Hubbs & R. R. Miller, 1977) (Bicolor minnow)
 Tampichthys erimyzonops (C. L. Hubbs & R. R. Miller, 1974) (Chubsucker minnow)
 Tampichthys ipni (Álvarez & Navarro, 1953) (Lantern minnow)
 Tampichthys mandibularis (Contreras-Balderas & Verduzco-Martínez, 1977) (Flatjaw minnow)
 Tampichthys rasconis (D. S. Jordan & Snyder, 1899) (Blackstripe minnow)

References

 
Cyprinidae genera
Cyprinid fish of North America
Freshwater fish of Mexico